The locations on the standard British version of the board game Monopoly are set in London and were selected in 1935 by Victor Watson, managing director of John Waddington Limited. Watson became interested in the board game after his son Norman had tried the Parker Brothers original US version and recommended the company produce a board for the domestic market. He took his secretary Marjory Phillips on a day-trip from the head offices in Leeds to London and the pair looked for suitable locations to use.

The London version of the game was successful, and in 1936 it was exported to Continental Europe, Australia, New Zealand and South Africa, becoming the de facto standard board in the British Commonwealth. It became such a success in the UK that Waddingtons ran Monopoly competitions in locations depicted on the board; one such contest was held on platforms 3 and 4 of Fenchurch Street station. The resulting board has been perennially popular around the world, with the chosen locations becoming familiar to millions. Tourists from as far as Canada, Singapore and Saudi Arabia have been known to visit specific locations in London because of their presence on the Monopoly board. In 2003, Watson's grandson (also called Victor Watson) unveiled a plaque at what is now a branch of The Co-operative Bank, the original location of the Angel, Islington, to commemorate the elder Watson's contribution to British popular culture.

The set has been celebrated by the Monopoly pub crawl, which attempts to visit all the locations on the board and have a drink at a pub in each one. The relative wealth of the various places has changed slightly. Whitechapel Road is now the cheapest (as opposed to Old Kent Road) but Mayfair remains the most expensive; in 2016 an estimate by loan provider West One showed the average house price on each was £590,000 and £3,150,000 respectively.


Locations
The final list mixes well-known landmarks with relatively obscure locations. There appears to be no specific motivation for how they were chosen; when the travel writer Tim Moore searched the Waddingtons' company archives he did not uncover any relevant documentation.

The light blue set are all part of the London Inner Ring Road, this section of which opened in 1756 as the New Road. From west to east the road runs as Euston Road to King's Cross, then Pentonville Road to the Angel, Islington. The three streets in the pink (or purple) set all converge at Trafalgar Square, and the red set are all adjacent to each other as part of the A4 road, a major road running west from Central London. The orange set is related to locations dealing with the police and law. The yellow set has an entertainment and nightlife-based theme; Leicester Square is known for cinemas and theatres, Coventry Street for clubs and restaurants, and Piccadilly for hotels. The streets in the green set have a background in retail and commercial properties.

The stations were the four London termini of the London and North Eastern Railway, principally King's Cross, which served Waddingtons' home town of Leeds. Original Monopoly boards manufactured before the Transport Act 1947 and the nationalisation of the railways use the name "L.N.E.R." on each title deed card; later boards showed "British Railways" instead.

Some elements of the US board were unchanged, leading to apparent idiosyncrasies. The police officer on Go To Jail is wearing a New York City Police Department hat, not a Metropolitan Police helmet, while the car on Free Parking has a Whitewall spare tyre, which was uncommon in the UK. The term Community Chest was a welfare support system present in the Great Depression and has not been used in Britain.

Note: the table excludes the non-specific "Go", "Jail", "Electric Company", "Free Parking", "Water Works" and "Go To Jail" squares. Chance and Community Chest squares are also omitted.

References
Notes

Citations

Sources

External links
 London Monopoly Map from Google Maps
 Monopoly Board Pub Crawl website

Monopoly
Monopoly (game)